The B&T APC (Advanced Police Carbine) is a family of firearms produced and manufactured by B&T (formerly known as Brügger & Thomet) of Switzerland. Announced in 2011, the submachine gun series uses standard 9×19mm (APC9), .40 S&W (APC40), 10mm Auto (APC10) and .45 ACP (APC45) ammunition.

History and overview 

The APC series was designed in the 2000s, as a modern submachine gun that would be cheaper to produce than the intermediate cartridge assault carbines that were seeing an increase in military usage during this period. Before this point, B&T sold the MP9 and had experience in the manufacture of submachine guns, as well as years of feedback from customers on possible enhancements. The first B&T APCs were produced in 2011.

In March 2019, B&T released its APC9 PRO series, an improvement with a non-reciprocating charging handle and a replaceable pistol grip, compatible with grips for the AR-15 style rifle family of firearms. The APC9 PRO features an optional lower receiver capable of using Glock magazines.

On March 29, 2019, B&T was awarded a contract in the U.S. Army's Sub Compact Weapon Production-Other Transaction Agreement (P-OTA) competition for its APC9K submachine gun. The $2.6 million contract included an initial 350 subcompact weapons (SCW) with an option for additional quantities of up to 1,000 SCWs, with slings, manuals, accessories, and spare parts.

Design 
The APC uses a straight blowback gas system. The addition of a proprietary hydraulic buffer system in the receiver back plate helps control recoil. More than 50% of the APC's parts are interchangeable between the different platforms.

The APC's upper receiver is made from aerospace-grade alloy, and the lower receiver, pistol grips, magazine, and butt stock are made from polymer. The APC uses the same magazines as the MP9.

The APC's mechanical sight is composed of an adjustable ghost ring type rear sight and a cylindrical sight. Sights can be folded in the base when not in use, and will pop out quickly when in use. The APC has an H&K MP5 style locked lugs-style barrel and can be equipped with a quick-release suppressor or flash hider. The APC45's barrel comes with a flash hider by default.

The APC shares a side-folding polymer stock with the B&T GL-06 grenade launcher. The trigger assembly is effectively the same as the AR-15/M16 rifle, and accepts many after-market replacement parts. The entire weapon, including the charging handle, are ambidextrous, and can be adjusted based on the operator's handedness.

Variants 
The APC submachine gun is offered in several variants. All variants are available in 9×19mm (APC9) and .45 ACP (APC45) calibres. The APC PRO series has the capability to have different calibre options, stocks, suppressors, accessories, training versions and the ability to accept either Glock or SIG P320 magazines, giving the platform vast modularity for its operators.

 APC9 – The basic model, which adopts a polymer receiver, magazine, and folding stock. It is select fire, and may be loaded either with 15-, 20-, 25-, or 30-round magazines.
 APC9 G – An APC9 with a lower receiver that is compatible with Glock pistol magazines.
 APC9 K – Shortened barrel variant of the APC9.
 APC9-SD – Variant of the APC9 with an integrated suppressor.
 APC9 Carbine – Civilian version of the APC9, can only be fired in semi-auto.
  APC9-P Carbine – Police version of the APC9 carbine. Comes with longer handguards and longer barrel.
 APC9 Sports Carbine – Sporting version of the APC9 carbine. Comes with longer handguards and longer barrel.
 APC40 – .40 S&W version of the APC9.
 APC10 – 10mm Auto version of the APC9.
 APC45 – .45 ACP version of the APC9.
 APC45-SD – Integrally suppressed variant of the APC45.

Users
{| class="wikitable"
|-
! Country
! Organization name
! Model
! Quantity
! Date
! Reference
|-
|
|Argentine Army
Agrupacion de Fuerzas de Operaciones Especiales
| align="center" | APC9K, APC9SD, APC9 PRO G
| align="center" | 263
| align="center" | 2020-2021
| align="center" | 
|-
|
| Military Police of São Paulo State
| align="center" | APC40 PRO
| align="center" | 1000
| align="center" | Dec 2020
| align="center" | 
|-
|
|Slovak Police Force
Prison and Court Guard Service
| align="center" | APC9
| align="center" | 26+
| align="center" | 2019
| align="center" |  
|-
| rowspan="4" |
|United States Army Personal Security Detachments
| align="center" | APC9K
| align="center" | 350
| align="center" | 2019
| align="center" |
|-
|United States Air Force Personal Security Detachments
| align="center" | APC9K
| align="center" | 65
| align="center" | 2020
| align="center" |
|-
|Westchester County Police
| align="center" | APC9SD
| align="center" | -
| align="center" | 2019
| align="center" |
|-
|Miami Beach Police Department
| align="center" | APC9K Pro
| align="center" | -
| align="center" | 2020
| align="center" |

|-
|}

See also
 CZ Scorpion EVO 3
 FAMAE SAF
SIG MPX

References

External links

9mm Parabellum submachine guns
Submachine guns of Switzerland